Circumstantial Evidence (German: Indizienbeweis) is a 1929 German silent crime film directed by Georg Jacoby and starring Fritz Alberti, Ruth Weyher, Valy Arnheim and Henry Edwards. It is based on the 1886 novel Vendetta by Marie Corelli. Countess Romani grows bored of her life in Corsica and wishes to go elsewhere. It is also known by the alternative title Vendetta. It premiered on 15 February 1929.

Cast
Ruth Weyher as Countess Romani
Olaf Fjord as Georges
Henry Edwards as Count Fabio Romani
Suzy Vernon as Maria Ferrat
Inge Landgut as Stella
Hilde Jennings as Zofe der Gräfin
Bernd Aldor as alter Diener
Félix P. Soler as Hassan Salem
Fritz Alberti as Gerichtspräsident
Paul Nikolaus as Prosecutor
Max Neufeld as Defense lawyer
Otto Kronburger as Kommissar
Valy Arnheim as Detektiv
Karl Elzer as Oberkellner

References

External links

Films of the Weimar Republic
1929 crime films
German crime films
German silent feature films
Films directed by Georg Jacoby
Films based on British novels
Films based on works by Marie Corelli
Films set in Corsica
German black-and-white films
1920s German films
1920s German-language films